Röszke is a village in Csongrád county, in the Southern Great Plain region of southern Hungary. The nearest town is Szeged .

Sándor Rózsa, the legendary Hungarian bandit was born here in 1813.

Geography

Border crossing

On the other side of the border in Serbia the first settlement is Horgoš where the E75 in Serbia begins. During the European migrant crisis, the village served as a refugee camp for refugees.

Notable residents
 Sándor Rózsa (1813 – 1878), Hungarian betyár

Gallery

References 

Populated places in Csongrád-Csanád County
Hungary–Serbia border crossings